Uttukuli railway station is a railway station in Uthukuli, in Tiruppur district of Tamil Nadu, India.

References

Salem railway division

Railway stations in Tiruppur district